Chris Laurence (born 6 January 1949) is an English musician. Born in London, he studied at the Guildhall School of Music and Drama, and primarily works with jazz and classical music. In the classical world he was principal double bass with the Academy of St Martin in the Fields orchestra until 1995, playing on many of their recordings ranging from the film Amadeus to Benjamin Britten's Curlew River. He has recorded with many jazz artists, including trombonist J. J. Johnson, Tony Coe, Joe Williams, Sarah Vaughan, Clark Terry, Johnny Mathis, and Lena Horne. His most recent recordings include John Surman's The Spaces in Between (2007), Kenny Wheeler's The Long Waiting (2012) and Songs for Quintet on ECM Records, and Norma Winstone's Manhattan in the Rain (1998). He has also recorded music for television, film, and albums, most notably Leaving Las Vegas (1995), Ken Loach's Looking for Eric (2009), The Constant Gardener (2005), Howard Shore's score for Hugo (2011), and most recently was featured on the soundtrack of Mike Leigh's Mr. Turner (2014). In 2007, he recorded a CD with his own jazz quartet titled New View, released on the Basho label along with Frank Ricotti (vibes), John Parricelli (guitar), Martin France (drums), and featuring Norma Winstone (vocals).

As well as jazz and classical music, Laurence has also featured on albums with many stars including Elton John, Sting, Peter Gabriel, Mary Chapin Carpenter, Joni Mitchell, David Gilmour, Michel Legrand, and guitarist John Williams.

Select discography

Chris Laurence Quartet (As leader)
 New View (Basho) (2007)

With David Gilmour
 On an Island (Columbia)
 Rattle That Lock (Columbia)

With Barry Guy/The London Jazz Composers' Orchestra
 Ode (Incus, 1972)

With Michael Nyman
 The Cook The Thief His Wife & Her Lover (Virgin Venture)
 The End of the Affair (Sony Classical)
 Six Celan Songs/The Ballad of Kastriot Rexhepi (MN)
 Love Counts (MN)
 À la folie (Virgin Venture)

With Alan Skidmore
 T.C.B. (Philips)
 El Skid w/ Elton Dean

With John Surman
 Morning Glory
 The Brass Project (ECM, 1992)
 Stranger than Fiction (ECM, 1995)
 Coruscating (ECM, 1999)
 The Spaces in Between (ECM, 2006)

With John Taylor
 Pause, and Think Again (Turtle)
 Decipher (MPS)

With Kenny Wheeler
 Kayak (Ah Um, Ah Um )
Dream Sequence (Psi, 1995-2003 [2003])
 Songs for Quintet (ECM, 2013 [2015])
 Six for Six (Cam Jazz)
 The Long Waiting

With Frank Ricotti Quartet
 Our Point of View (CBS)

With Gordon Beck
 Once Is Never Enough (FMR)

With John Williams
 The Magic Box (Sony Classical)

With Elton Dean
 They All Be on This Old Road (Ogun)
With the Academy of St. Martin in the FIelds
 Curlew River
 Amadeus
With Tony Coe
 Nutty on Wilisa
 Les Sources Bleues Camomil
 Mainly Mancini
With Lena Horne
 A New Album
With Sarah Vaughn
 The Gold Collection: Sings the Poetry of Pope John Paul II 
With Harry Beckett
 Warm Smiles
 Flare Up
With Maurice Andrea/ Michel Legrand
 Windmills
With Geoff Eales
 Master of the Game
 Transience
With Johnnie Mathis
 In a Sentimental Mood
With Norma Winstone
 Manhattan in the Rain
 Edge of Time
With Mike de Albuquerque
 We May Be Castle but We All Have Names
 First Wind
With Peter Gabriel
 Scratch My Back (New Blood Orchestra)
 New Blood
With Gil Evans
 Absolute Beginners
 Having It All
 Va Va Voom
 Insignificance
With John Warren
 Travellers Tale
With Mike Figgis
 Leaving Las Vegas
With Anja Garbarek
 Smiling and Waving
With Brigitte Baraha
 Babelfish
 Chasing Rainbows
With Helen Jane Long
 Intervention
With Michel Legrand
 Radio Days
With Robert Farnon
 Carol Kidd, A Place in My Heart
 Jose Careres, Love Is (1984)
 Jane Pickles, Hey There (Vocalion)
 JJ Johnson, Tangence
 Joe Williams, Here's To Life
 Eileen Farrell, Love Is Letting Go
With Elton John
 Madman Across The Water
 Tumbleweed Connection
With Joni Mitchell
 Both Sides Now
 Travelogue
With Clark Terry
 Clark After Dark
With Guy Barker
 Holly
With Joe Douglas Trio
 Visage (Spotlight Records, 1979)
With Michael Garrick/ Don Weller
 You've Changed (1978)
With The Mike Westbrook Concert Band
 Metropolis (Citadel 315)
With Neil Ardley
 Symphony of Amarantis
With Andy Sheppard
 Dancing Man & Woman
 Learning to Wave
With Alan Davie
 Bird Through The Wall
With Alison Moyet
 Voice
With Elvis Costello
 Il Sogno (Ballet)
With Mark Hollis 
 Mark Hollis (Polydor)
With Zizi Possi
 Per Amore
With Dick Walter
 Capricorn Rising
With the London Trombone Quartet
 Some of Our Best Friends
With Michael Civisca
 Love is Like a Breeze
With Beryl Cook
 Live From London
With Morrissey
 He Knows I'd Love to See Him (His Master's Voice, 1990)

 Soundtracks 
 Amadeus – Peter Shaffer
 Mr. Turner – Gary Yershon
 Leaving Las Vegas – Anthony Marinelli and Mike Figgis
 Hugo – Howard Shore
 Looking for Eric – George Fenton
 The Constant Gardener – Alberto Iglesias and Robert Church
 Shaun the Sheep Movie – Ilan Eshkeri
 The Man Who Cried – Kronos Quartet
 Tim's Vermeer'' – Conrad Pope

References

1949 births
Living people
Musicians from London
British jazz double-bassists
Male double-bassists
British male jazz musicians
21st-century double-bassists
21st-century British male musicians
Penguin Cafe Orchestra members
Basho Records artists
Alumni of the Guildhall School of Music and Drama